Gerdes Folk City, sometimes spelled Gerde's Folk City, was a music venue in the West Village, part of Greenwich Village, Manhattan, in New York City. Initially opened by owner Mike Porco as a restaurant called Gerdes, it eventually began to present occasional incidental music. It was first located at 11 West 4th Street (in a building which no longer exists), before moving in 1970 to 130 West 3rd Street. The club closed in 1987.

On January 26, 1960, Gerdes turned into a music venue called The Fifth Peg, in cooperation with Izzy Young, the director of the Folklore Center. The Fifth Peg's debut bill was gospel folk singer Brother John Sellars and Ed McCurdy, writer of the anti-war classic "Last Night I Had the Strangest Dream". Porco and Young had a falling-out, and on June 1, 1960, Gerdes Folk City was officially born, with a bill featuring folk singers Carolyn Hester and Logan English. Gerdes Folk City was soon booked by English and folk enthusiast Charlie Rothschild (who later became Judy Collins' long-time manager).

Gerdes Folk City quickly emerged as one of the central music venues of the era, helping to launch the careers of several world-renowned musical acts, from Bob Dylan to Sonic Youth, and showcased numerous music styles from folk to alternative rock. It became one of the most influential American music clubs before finally losing its lease in 1987. "Rolling Stone Book of Lists" called Folk City one of the three top music venues in the world, along with The Cavern and CBGB.

History
Opening officially on January 26, 1960, Folk City was born in Greenwich Village, and generated several waves of musical genres ranging from folk music to rock 'n' roll; folk rock to punk; blues to alternative rock, bringing the world a wide range of music from Pete Seeger to 10,000 Maniacs.  Singer and poet Logan English performed at the opening night, together with Carolyn Hester.  From The Weavers to Sonny Terry and Brownie McGhee, Judy Collins and Rev. Gary Davis, many musicians who formed contemporary music's foundation performed there. Doc Watson made his first solo performance at Gerdes. It was recorded and released as Doc Watson at Gerdes Folk City. Simon & Garfunkel and Peter, Paul & Mary performed early in their professional careers at Gerdes, and Peter, Paul & Mary's first official performance as a trio was at Folk City.<ref>[http://czakl.blogspot.com/2010/05/my-back-pages-commemorating-gerdes-folk.html Critic-at-Large, Commemorating Gerdes Folk City] Retrieved July 1, 2010</ref>

Bob Dylan played his first professional gig there on April 11, 1961, supporting John Lee Hooker. Logan English was instrumental in securing Dylan his first appearance.  His widow Barbara Shutner said:

My husband Logan English and I met Bob Dylan at Bob and Sid Gleason's house ... One night we were all sitting around and Woody [Guthrie] said something like, "Play something" to this kid sitting on the couch. The kid was Bob Dylan, and he sang and it was just beautiful. So Logan said, "I'm working at Gerde's. I'm the MC. We'll get you to play there." So that Monday night, Bob came in and did his first set.

Dylan's September 29, 1961 appearance was reviewed in The New York Times by Robert Shelton, after which Dylan's reputation was made. Gerdes was where Bob Dylan debuted "Blowin' in the Wind" and was also the place where Joan Baez and Dylan met for the first time. On October 23, 1975, at a celebration for Mike Porco's 61st birthday, Dylan's Rolling Thunder Revue staged a dress rehearsal and played its first real concert. The Revue began its national tour a week after playing at Gerdes on October 30, 1975.

In May 1976, folk legend Bob Gibson and his manager Doug Yeager produced a week-long celebration to Mike Porco and Folk City, where more than thirty of the club's early star performers came out to honor the club. Folk City is the place where many of the 1960s folk-rock and '70s singer-songwriters first found their voices, and shows included future stars such as Janis Joplin, Jimi Hendrix, The Mamas and The Papas, the Byrds, The Lovin' Spoonful, the Youngbloods, Emmylou Harris (who also waitressed at the club), Joni Mitchell, Phoebe Snow, Loudon Wainwright III and many other well-known names.

New ownership
Starting in 1978, the soon-to-be new owners, Robbie Woliver, Marilyn Lash and Joseph Hillesum took over the booking duties from Mike Porco, continuing to 1980 when they officially bought the club from Porco. Folk City, under new ownership, underwent a revival, bringing back folk legends like Odetta, Arlo Guthrie, Ewan MacColl ("The First Time Ever I Saw Your Face"), Maria Muldaur, Eric Andersen, The Band and others, and also introducing a new breed of singer-songwriter and expanding its boundaries to a wider range of rock music, especially alternative music like Richard Thompson, Pentangle, Elvis Costello, Sonic Youth, The Bongos (who made their debut there backing up Helen Hooke of The Deadly Nightshade), Yo La Tengo, the Replacements, 10,000 Maniacs and many others. A new wave of singer-songwriters found a home at Folk City during this time as well, such as Suzanne Vega, Shawn Colvin, Lucinda Williams and comedians Adam Sandler, Chris Rock and others.

Folk City was not just about music; comedians also performed at the club throughout its history. From Martin Mull to Andy Kaufman, many comic actors and comedians got their early start at the club: Adam Sandler, Chris Rock, Kathy Kinney, Carol Leifer, Richard Lewis, Mary Kay Place, Larry David, Jim Belushi, Andy Breckman (creator of Monk), Martin Mull, Steve Buscemi and more. Under the direction of actress/comedian/singer Jane Brucker ("One Life To Live, "Dirty Dancing"), improv and comedy became all the rage, with Jane introducing such new acts as Adam Sandler and Kathy Kinney ("Mimi" on the Drew Carey Show.) Actor/director Matt Mitler created "Theater Night at Folk City," where singer/performer Fran Maya introduced Steve Buscemi and his partner Mark Boone Jr. (Sons of Anarchy) who became popular mainstays at the venue. Other artists in the vanguard of the performance scene who frequented "Theater Night" include John Kelly, David Cale, Georg Osterman, Kestutis Nakas, and Anna Kohler.

In the 1980s, the club underwent another revival, introducing a new breed of singer-songwriter and in expanding its boundaries to a wider range of rock music,  with its alternative Wednesday night music series "Music For Dozens," which featured David Johansen, Sonic Youth, Yo La Tengo, Alex Chilton, the Minutemen, The Smithereens, Violent Femmes, The Replacements, 10,000 Maniacs, Richard Lloyd, Chris Stamey, Dream Syndicate, Hüsker Dü, X, Golden Palominos, the Blasters and many others. A new wave of singer-songwriters found a home at Folk City during this time as well, such as Suzanne Vega, Shawn Colvin and Lucinda Williams. In 1982, Kevin F King, and the Seven Letters performed in one of the final Best of the Songwriters Series.

In 1985, the club held a benefit 25th Anniversary Concert, which was part of the NYC Pier Summer Concerts, and was an immediate sell-out. The club lost its lease and closed in 1987, at the height of its revival.

The owners, however, have continued over the years to produce and present Folk City concerts and performances around the country featuring Folk City alumni and new up-and-coming artists.

A theatrical production - Folk City - a musical based on the club's history and the book "Bringing It All Back Home," by Robbie Woliver (play written by Woliver and Bernadette Contreras) was produced at Theater for the New City in New York City and at the Brunish Theater in Portland Oregon. It won 10 out of the 10 Broadway World awards for which it was nominated, including "Best Musical."

Partial list of performers
Gerde's. has hosted performances by:

 Bert Sommer
 David Amram
 Eric Andersen
 Dominic Chianese, who acted as MC and house-performer for many years
 Joan Baez
 Pat Benatar
 The Band
 Bermuda Triangle Band
 The Bongos
 Oscar Brand
 David Bromberg
 Judy Collins
 Johnny Cash
 T-Bone Burnett
 Harry Chapin
 Dominic Chianese
 The Clancy Brothers
 Shawn Colvin
 Larry Coryell
 Elvis Costello
 Richard Robinson 
 David Crosby
 Rev. Gary Davis
 Dinosaur Jr
 John Denver
 Bob Dylan
 The Mamas and The Papas
 The Byrds
 Dream Syndicate
 Ramblin' Jack Elliott
 John Fahey
 Richard Farina
 Jose Feliciano
 Bob Gibson
 Allen Ginsberg
 Cynthia Gooding
 Karen Gorney
 The Greenbriar Boys
 Arlo Guthrie
 Tim Hardin
 Jack Hardy
 Richie Havens,
 Screamin' Jay Hawkins
 Jimi Hendrix
 Carolyn Hester
 Helen Hooke (The Deadly Nightshade) 
 John Lee Hooker
 Cisco Houston
 Hüsker Dü
 Janis Ian
 Jake and the Family Jewels
 Lonnie Johnson
 The Johnstons
 Janis Joplin
 Al Kooper
 Buzzy Linhart
 Rod MacDonald
 Raun MacKinnon
 Taj Mahal
 Tommy Makem
 Melissa Manchester
 The Manhattan Transfer
 Barry Manilow
 Buffy Sainte-Marie
 Kate & Anna McGarrigle
 Melanie
 Bette Midler
 Liza Minnelli
 the Minutemen
 Joni Mitchell
Eddie Mottau
 Phil Ochs
 Odetta
 Tom Paxton
 Pentangle,
 The Roches
 Jimmy Rogers
 Linda Ronstadt
 Brother John Sellers
 Carly Simon
 Simon and Garfunkel (as Kane & Garr)
 Patti Smith
 Phoebe Snow
 The Smithereens
 Victoria Spivey
 Salem 66
 The Staple Singers
 Andy Statman
 Steely Dan
 Sonny Terry and Brownie McGhee
 Richard Thompson
 10,000 Maniacs
 Dave Van Ronk
 Townes van Zandt
 Violent Femmes
 Loudon Wainwright III
 Muddy Waters
 Doc Watson
 Josh White
 Josh White Jr.
 Lucinda Williams
 The Youngbloods
 Grayson Hugh

Recordings
Live albums recorded at Gerde's Folk City include:Reverend Gary Davis at Gerde's Folk City, February 1962Big Joe Williams at Folk City, February 26, 1962Doc Watson at Gerdes Folk CityJean Ritchie and Doc Watson at Gerde's Folk City, 1963
Richard Thompson – Small Town RomanceFurther readingBringing It All Back Home (Pantheon/Random House, 1986) by Robbie Woliver documents Folk City's history and went into a second printing as Hoot'' (St. Martins Press, 1994).

See also
Cafe Wha?
Live at The Gaslight 1962
Cafe Au Go Go
The Gaslight Cafe
The Bitter End

References

1960 establishments in New York City
Nightclubs in Manhattan
Coffeehouses and cafés in the United States
Folk music venues
Defunct drinking establishments in Manhattan
Cultural history of New York City
Former music venues in New York City
Drinking establishments in Greenwich Village
1987 disestablishments in New York (state)